The Lhasa terrane is a terrane, or fragment of crustal material, sutured to the Eurasian Plate during the Cretaceous that forms present-day southern Tibet. It takes its name from the city of Lhasa in the Tibet Autonomous Region, China. The northern part may have originated in the East African Orogeny, while the southern part appears to have once been part of Australia. The two parts joined, were later attached to Asia, and then were impacted by the collision of the Indian Plate that formed the Himalayas.

Location

The Lhasa terrane is separated from the Himalayas to the south by the Yarlung-Tsangpo suture, and from the Qiangtang terrane to the north by the Bangong-Nujiang suture.
The Lhasa terrane has a Precambrian crystalline basement overlaid with sedimentary strata from the Paleozoic ( Ma) and Mesozoic ( Ma) and containing magmatic rocks from the Paleozoic to Cenozoic (66 Ma to the present). 
It is thought to be the last crustal block to accrete to the Eurasian plate before it collided with the Indian plate in the Cenozoic.

Origins

The Lhasa terrane consisted of two blocks before the Mesozoic, the North Lhasa Block and the South Lhasa Block.
The two blocks have lithology and detrital zircon ages similar to the Qiangtang terrane and to Tethyan strata in the Himalaya, which suggests these areas were nearby in Gondwana. The detrital zircon ages differ somewhat between the North and South Lhasa terranes.
The South Lhasa terrane appears to have evolved as part of Australia in the late Precambrian and early Paleozoic.
Isotopic analysis of detrital zircons of  Ma from Paleozoic metasedimentary rocks in the Lhasa terrane shows identical values to detrital zircons of the same age from Western Australia. The detrital zircons probably came from southwest Australia's Albany-Fraser belt.

The North Lhasa terrane may have been formed in part from the northern part of the East African Orogeny.
Neoproterozoic oceanic crustal rocks are included in the crystalline basement of the North Lhasa terrane, which are probably from the Mozambique Ocean that formed when the Rodinia super-continent broke up. In the Late Cryogenian, around 650 Ma, the oceanic crustal basement of North Lhasa experienced HP metamorphism in the subduction zone associated with the closing of the Mozambique ocean. In the Early Paleozoic around 485 Ma it experienced MP metamorphism associated with the amalgamation of Eastern and Western Gondwana.

In the Early Paleozoic the North and South Lhasa terranes and the Qiangtang terrane experienced magmatism that seems to have been the result of an Andean-type orogeny caused when the Proto-Tethys Ocean was subducted after Gondwana was finally amalgamated.
In the Middle Paleozoic around 360 Ma the Lhasa and Qiangtang terranes again experienced magmatism, apparently due to the subduction of the Paleo-Tethys Ocean.

Formation and evolution

The Lhasa terrane was formed from the North and South Lhasa terranes, which were at first separated by the Paleo-Tethys Ocean, and were joined in a suture zone in the Late Paleozoic.
The Paleo-Tethys Ocean that separated the North and South Lhasa terranes closed, and around 260 Ma in the Late Permian an HP metamorphic belt formed between the two blocks.
Around 220 Ma in the Triassic an MP metamorphic belt formed.

The Tibetan Plateau was formed from a number of continental terranes that rifted from northern Gondwana in the Paleozoic and Mesozoic, moved northward and accreted to southern Asia. 
The Lhasa terrane is the farthest south of these terranes. 
The Lhasa terrane moved northward and collided with the Qiangtang terrane along the Banggongco-Nujiang Suture.
The collision began towards the end of the late Jurassic ( Ma), and collision activity continued until the early Late Cretaceous Ma . 
During this period the terrane may have been shortened by at least .
Strata from the Lower Jurassic in the Bangong suture between the Lhasa and Qiangtang terranes differ from the rocks in the Lhasa terrane and appear to have a unique source.

The collision with the Qiangtang terrane caused a peripheral foreland basin to form in the north part of the Lhasa terrane, which persisted into the Early Cretaceous. 
In some parts of the foreland basin the north-dipping subduction of the Neotethyan oceanic crust below the Lhasa terrane caused volcanism. 
The Gangdese volcanic arc was formed as this subduction continued along the southern margin of the Lhasa terrane.
The Gangdese batholith intrudes the southern half of the Lhasa terrain.
There is evidence that by the end of the Cretaceous the Southern Tibet crust was approximately twice as thick as normal.

Clastic sediments found in the terrane were deposited in shallow waters during the Early Cretaceous ( Ma.)
In northern Lhasa these sediments formed in the foreland basin created during the Lhasa–Qiangtang collision.
They are overlaid by marine limestone from the Aptian-Albian period, deposited in a shallow continental seaway. The Takena Formation developed in the Late Cretaceous in the foreland basin to the north of the Gangdese magmatic arc, and consists of marine limestone overlaid by fluvial red beds.
Outcropped folds in the Takena Formation between Lhasa and Yangbajain are upright or lean slightly to the north or south, and indicate 30% to 50% shortening in the Late Cretaceous before the Indian collision.

India–Asia collision

Contact with Indian Plate began along the Yarlung-Zangbo suture around 50 Ma during the Eocene, and the two continents continue to converge. 
Magmatism continued in the Gangdese arc until as late as 40 Ma.
There are competing hypotheses about the details of the tectonic processes during the collision between the Indian and Eurasian plates.
At one extreme, some consider that during the collision the Indian crust was underthrust beneath the southern Asian crust, or injected into this crust. At the other extreme, some consider that the convergence was mostly accommodated by shortening of the Asian crust.

The reflection undulates, so the melt zone may have been tectonically deformed. North-dipping reflections deep in the crust below the Gangdese batholith at a depth of  may mark the downdip of the Yarlung-Zangbo suture, or may mark a more recent reverse fault.
Taken together, the results indicate that the upper crust of the Lhasa terrane was moderately shortened by the collision, with melting in the middle crust. 
They neither support nor rule out underthrusting or fluid injection of the Indian continental crust below the Lhasa terrane.

The Linzizong Formation is distributed widely along the Gangdese Belt. It was emplaced between 69 and 43 Ma near Lhasa and between 54 and 37 Ma in southwestern Tibet.
It is slightly folded and slopes gently to the north. 
The results of palaeomagnetic studies of the Linzizong Formation in the Linzhou Basin and the Takena Formation reported in 2009 indicate that there was little movement of the Lhasa terrane in the Cretaceous and Early Eocene.
This implies that there was significant crustal shortening as the collision progressed.
The South Lhasa terrane experienced metamorphism and magmatism in the Early Cenozoic (55–45 Ma) and metamorphism in the Late Eocene (40–30 Ma), presumably due to the collision between the continents of India and Eurasia.

Strata

Sedimentary strata from the Palaeozoic are mainly Carboniferous sandstone, metasandstone, shale and phyllite, and lesser Ordovician, Silurian and Permian limestone.
Precambrian strata are rarely exposed.
Rocks from the Triassic include inter-bedded limestone and basaltic volcanic units, most common along the terrane's southern margin.
In the northern terrane the Jurassic strata are deepwater sandstone and shale, often with ophiolitic assemblages.
In the southern terrane the Jurassic strata are marine limestone and mudstone.
Strata from the Lower Cretaceous are clastic mudstone, sandstone and local conglomerate units.
The Lower Cretaceous clastic units are overlaid by a shallow marine limestone from the Aptian-Albian period, exposed in many places, which in some places holds Cenomanian fossils.
The strata from the Upper Cretaceous are successions of arkosic fluvial sandstone and mudstone.

See also 

Lahsa Terrane related (from south to north)
 Geology of the Himalaya
 Indus Suture Zone 
 Transhimalaya, includes Lhasa terrane and Karakoram fault system
 High pressure metamorphic terranes along the Bangong-Nujiang Suture Zone
 Qiangtang terrane

References

Sources

External links
India-Asia Continental Collision, animations by Tanya Atwater

Terranes
Geology of Tibet
Historical tectonic plates
Mesozoic geology
Mesozoic Asia
Natural history of Asia
Precambrian
Tectonic plates